Oberndorf bei Salzburg (Central Bavarian: Owerndorf ba Såizburg) is a small city in the Austrian state of Salzburg, about 17 km (11 mi) north of the City of Salzburg. It is situated on the river Salzach in the Flachgau district. Town privileges were granted on April 30th, 2001.

History
The town across the Salzach is Laufen in Bavaria. The town was split in two in the wake of the Napoleonic Wars when the former Principality of the Salzburg Archbishops was divided in 1816 following the Congress of Vienna into a part taken by the Kingdom of Bavaria and a part taken by the Austrian Empire.

Silent Night
Oberndorf is famous worldwide as the birthplace of the carol Silent Night (German: Stille Nacht), which was first performed at the former St. Nikola parish church by the schoolmaster Franz Xaver Gruber and the young priest Joseph Mohr on Christmas Eve 1818, from where it spread out to the world. As in the 1890s several floods of the Salzach River destroyed large parts of Oberndorf, the church was finally demolished and a memorial chapel erected on its site in 1937. A full-scale replica of the memorial chapel, built in 1992, can be found in Frankenmuth, Michigan.

Transport
Oberndorf can be reached from Salzburg by S-Bahn rapid transit railway and the B 156 Lamprechtshausener Straße federal highway running from Salzburg toward Braunau am Inn.

Personalities
 Leopold Kohr (1909–1994), economist, was born in Oberndorf
 Benita Ferrero-Waldner, diplomat, born 1948 in Salzburg, but grew up in Oberndorf
 Florian Wenninger, historian, born in Oberndorf in 1978
 Georg Djundja (Social Democratic Party of Austria), first elected openly gay mayor in Austria.

See also
 Salzburg
 Salzburgerland

References

External links 
 
 Silent Night Website
 180 Years of "Silent Night"
 Silent Night Museum

Cities and towns in Salzburg-Umgebung District